Catherine Ringer (born 18 October 1957) is a French singer, songwriter, composer, multi-instrumentalist, dancer, choreographer, actress, and co-founder of the pop rock group Les Rita Mitsouko.  She is also the daughter of French artist Sam Ringer. She is also the lead vocalist for Plaza Francia Orchestra where she performs with Eduardo Makaroff and Christoph H. Müller, formerly of Gotan Project.

Biography
Ringer started her professional career on stage in the late 1970s in productions with Michael Lonsdale's Théâtre de Recherche Musicale as well as musical and dance productions. In 1976, she met the Argentine dancer and choreographer Marcia Moretto with whom she studied and also performed in various venues in Paris. The hit song "Marcia Baïla" was written as a tribute to Moretto after her death in 1981. 

In 1979, she met Fred Chichin with whom she founded and co-led the music group Les Rita Mitsouko. Ringer continued leading the group after Chichin's death in November 2007.

Post the release of the 2010 Gotan Project album Tango 3.0, Ringer teamed up with members  Eduardo Makaroff and Christoph H. Müller to create Plaza Francia, now known as Plaza Francia Orchestra for their 7 April 2014 release A New Tango Song Book. The album came with critical acclaim and a commercial success in France also charting in Belgium and she continues to perform with them to this day.

Discography

Solo career

Albums
2011: Ring n' Roll
2014: A New Tango Song Book (with Plaza Francia)
2017: Chroniques et Fantaisies

Singles
1988: Qu’est-Ce Que T’es Belle (featuring Marc Lavoine)
1997: Eso es el amor
1998: Doux Daddy
2008: Parle plus bas (featuring Mauro Gioia)
2010: Les Bohémiens
2010: L'Adèle
2011: Quel est ton nom
2011: Pardon
2011: Vive l'amour
2012: Prends-moi
2012: Punk 103
2014: La Mano Encima (with Plaza Francia)
2014: Secreto (with Plaza Francia)
2014: Idées noires (featuring  Bernard Lavilliers)

Joint/collaborative singles
1995: "Peut-être ce soir" (from the album Roots by Coba)
1998: "Rendez-Vous" (from the album Conscious Posi by Coba)
1998: "Sa raison d'être (from the album Ensemble, AIDS charity)
1998: "Paranoïa" (from the album Les Liaisons Dangereuses by Doc Gyneco)
2002: "Tawes" (from the album "Uni-vers-elles" by Djura)
2004: "La bohême" duo with Corneille (CD and DVD)
2005: "Maudie" (from the album "Le Pavillon Des Fous" de Thomas Fersen)
2008: "Parle plus bas" (with Mauro Gioia) (2008)

 With Les Rita Mitsouko 

Albums
1984: Rita Mitsouko1986: The No Comprendo1988: Marc & Robert1990: Re (Compilation)
1993: Système D1996: Acoustiques (Live)
2000: Cool Frénésie2001: Le Bestov (Compilation)
2002: La Femme Trombone2004: Essentiel (Compilation)
2004: En concert avec l'Orchestre Lamoureux (Live)
2007: Variety With Plaza Francia Orchestra 
2014: A New Tango Song Book 
2018: Plaza Francia OrchestraSoundtracks for films
1985: Vagabond1986: Nuit d'ivresse1987: Keep Your Right Up1988: Kung Fu Master1988: 36 Fillette1989: Slaves of New York1990: Tatie Danielle1991: Les Amants du Pont-Neuf1993: My Favorite Season1995: The Three Brothers1995: The Apprentices1997: Le cousin1997: Sinon, oui1998: Un grand cri d'amour1998: White Lies1999: Belle maman2001: The Pornographer2001: A Hell of a Day2005: L'anniversaire2007: The Witnesses2007: La tête de maman2009: Korkoro2010: The Extraordinary Adventures of Adèle Blanc-SecFilmography
1969: Les Deux Coquines (Kiki) 
1976: La Fessée (Marcelle) by Burd Tranbaree
1976: Corps brûlants (uncredited) by Bart Caral
1977: Body Love (Martine) by Lasse Braun 
1977: Love Inferno (Monique) by Lasse Braun
1978: Color Climax Special 2571979: Poker Partouze by Joe de Palmer
1979: Histoires de cul by Michel Ricaud
1979: Paradise by Pierre B. Reinhard
1980: Petits trous libertins by Pierre B. Reinhard
1981: Mélodie pour Manuella by Joë de Palmer
1981: L'Éducation d'Orphelie by Michel Ricaud
1981: Lingeries intimes (La veuve) by Jean-Claude Roy
1981: Quella porcacciona di mia moglie (Angela) by Lorenzo Onorati
1981: Lea by Lorenzo Onorati
1981: Provinciales en chaleur (Julie) by Jean-Claude Roy 
1981: Innocence impudique by Jean-Claude Roy
1981: Gorges profondes et petites filles by Hubert Géral
1981: Marathon Love by Andrei Feher
1982: L'Inconnue by Alain Payet 
1983: Les Boulugres by Jean Hurtado
1987: Soigne ta droite by Jean-Luc Godard
2000: La Dame pipi'' by Jacques Richard

References

External links

Living people
1957 births
20th-century French actresses
French pornographic film actresses
French people of German descent
French people of Polish descent
People from Suresnes
Ringer, Catherine
Commandeurs of the Ordre des Arts et des Lettres
20th-century French women singers
Because Music artists
French women singer-songwriters